Francesca Baroni (born 4 November 1999) is an Italian professional racing cyclist, who currently rides for UCI Women's Continental Team  in road racing, and UCI Cyclo-cross Team Selle Italia–Guerciotti–Elite in cyclo-cross. In August 2020, she rode in the 2020 Strade Bianche Women's race in Italy.

References

External links
 

1999 births
Living people
Italian female cyclists
Cyclo-cross cyclists
People from Pietrasanta
Sportspeople from the Province of Lucca
Cyclists from Tuscany